Lee Sush-der (born 29 November 1951) is a Taiwanese politician. He is currently the president of the Taiwan Stock Exchange. He was the Minister of Finance from 2008 to 2012. Lee has also served in the Taipei and Kaohsiung city governments.

Education
Lee obtained his master's degree in business administration from Minnesota State University, Mankato.

References

Living people
Taiwanese Ministers of Finance
1951 births